Deep Family Secrets is a 1997 American drama television film directed by Arthur Allan Seidelman, that first aired on April 15, 1997 on the CBS television network.

The film is based on the true story of Gaylynn Morris, who was found guilty for the murder of his wife Ruby Morris, after Ruby disappeared in 1989. The names were changed to Clay and Renee Chadway in the television movie.

Plot
Renee has just surprised her husband, Clay, with her younger sister, Ellen, while they are at a restaurant. This impromptu meeting persuades her that her husband is cheating on her. Devastated, Renee returns home, hesitating to talk to her husband. Soon after, Renee disappears, mysteriously.

JoAnne, the couple's young daughter, does not know what to think of all these events and does not take long to bring back stories that had until then been carefully kept secret. Clay soon appears as the prime suspect in Renee's disappearance. Was she kidnapped or is it a murder?

Cast
Richard Crenna as Clay Chadway
Angie Dickinson as Renee Chadway
Molly Gross as JoAnne Chadway
Craig Wasson as Jack Winters
Meg Foster as Ellen
Jeff Kaiser as Bobby Chadway
Scott Paetty as Sam
Christie Lynn Smith as Lisa Chadway
Tony Musante as Lennox
Christine Healy as Hadley Brood
Christopher Titus as Cowboy #1

References

External links
 

1997 television films
1997 films
1997 drama films
CBS network films
Crime films based on actual events
Drama films based on actual events
Films directed by Arthur Allan Seidelman
American drama television films
1990s English-language films
1990s American films